is a fighting video game series developed and published in Japan by Arc System Works, and later localized in North America by Aksys Games and in Europe by Zen United. An anime adaptation aired in the fall of 2013.

Characters

Notes

: Downloadable character. In Cross Tag Battle, the superscript number next to this note indicates the number of season where that character first appeared.
: Available as a console-exclusive content.
: Can also be unlocked via normal gameplay.
: Playable in Continuum Shift Extend.
: Playable in Chrono Phantasma Extend/Chrono Phantasma 2.0.
: First appeared in the console/pre-2.0 arcade version of Chrono Phantasma.
: Appears as Lambda -No.11-'s Unlimited form.
: This total includes characters from Persona 4 Arena, Under Night In-Birth, RWBY, Arcana Heart, Senran Kagura, and Akatsuki Blitzkampf.

Playable in BlazBlue: Calamity Trigger

Ragna the Bloodedge
Voiced by (English): Patrick SeitzVoiced by (Japanese): Tomokazu Sugita
 is the main protagonist of the BlazBlue series from Calamity Trigger to Central Fiction. Also known as the Grim Reaper, he is feared by the NOL for being the most powerful individual to have ever rebelled against them since the Ikaruga Civil War. His actions, which included destroying countless numbers of their branches, have labeled him the most wanted criminal and caused him to receive the largest bounty ever in the history of the NOL. He possesses a powerful form of ars magus called the Azure Grimoire, or simply referred to as the titular BlazBlue, which is often either the secondary or primary target of those after him and his bounty. His ultimate goal is to destroy the NOL, for he blames them for destroying his family. He is Jin Kisaragi's biological brother, whose rivalry with him stems from an incident that happened when their sister Saya was presumably killed. His right arm is mechanical because his real one was cut off by Terumi, who had taken control of Jin's mind. He was resurrected by Rachel as a dhampir, causing one of his green eyes to turn red and his once-blond hair to white. The BlazBlue he possesses is only a fragment of an imitation; the true Grimoire is actually destined to be wielded by Noel Vermillion. In Continuum Shift, Ragna is given the Idea Engine by a dying Lambda which enabled him to access the true Azure. He realizes that Saya is possessed by Izanami and decides to give up vengeance to protect his loved ones in Chrono Phantasma, and later in Central Fiction decides to protect the girl inside Amaterasu from the Entitled-people whose dreams are strong enough to remake the world. He and Jin (including his future-past counterpart Hakumen) soon learned that Noel/Mu can be used to recreate Saya, whose soul remains in her old body, possessed by Izanami. Once Noel and Mu merge, he helps Noel merge with Izanami and imprison her into her soul, recreating Saya. With the help of Jin and Trinity after Ragna separates the Susano'o armor from Terumi, Jin transports Ragna and Terumi to the Azure void where Ragna can kill him for good. Once all evils are finished, and after helping Noel merge with the Origin to free her from the Amaterasu Unit, Ragna's last act is to cast himself into the cauldron and remain outside the world, to make sure the Azure never falls into the wrong hands. As this act would erase himself from the memories of everybody in the story, he says goodbye to his beloved siblings and tells Amane that he has no regrets at all. Ragna disappears and leaves only his sword behind, which is later put to the hill where it is placed on a hill near Celica's church as a makeshift grave. Whether or not Ragna is truly unable to return to the world is unknown, as the final scene shows that his sword has been taken by somebody. He is also hinted not to be a natural-born human due to his unusual features, an idea that is confirmed in the final game when it is revealed he is the child of the fifth Prime Field Device. Ragna's weapon is called Blood-Scythe (ブラッドサイズ Buraddo Saizu), a giant sword that can extend into a scythe. His Drive, Soul Eater, enables him to absorb a portion of the damage dealt to replenish his health.

Jin Kisaragi
Voiced by (English): David VincentVoiced by (Japanese): Tetsuya Kakihara
 is a former Major in the NOL and one of its elite commanding officers as well as the rival to Ragna. He is always cool and calm, but is also jealous, ambitious, and possessive with little care for others, treating them like they are mere obstacles. He displayed formidable actions to gain his rank during the Ikaruga Civil War. When he heard that Ragna the Bloodedge had arrived on the scene, he quickly abandoned his post to hunt him down by himself. The truth, however, is that Ragna is Jin's biological brother, and Jin's early feelings of rivalry were furthered by his visions of the future and his Nox Nyctores' amplification of his emotions. Terumi corrupted Jin's mind and incited him to hack off Ragna's arm (the latter nearly dying without the intervention of Rachel) and supposedly kills Saya, and Jin often says that he is looking forward to killing Ragna again. After the incident, he was adopted into the Kisaragi house, a highly powerful and respected family within the NOL. He possesses a notable psychosis, said to be caused by his sword, the Nox Nyctores . While the sword grants him manipulation over ice, it also enhances primal feelings and is often blamed for "insanity". It is also revealed that Hakumen is another incarnation of Jin from a different time cycle. Jin's Drive, Frost Bite, allows him to freeze his opponents. During Chrono Phantasma he begins to resist the effects of his weapon, and by Central Fiction he no longer acts insane towards Ragna. In the end of Central Fiction, once Ragna separates the Susano'o armor from Terumi, Jin is able to don the armor with the help of Trinity and kill Terumi's physical form before transporting his brother and Terumi to an Azure void where his brother can kill Terumi for good. When Ragna enacts his final act to take the Master Unit away with the world along with him, Jin initially objects his plan, until he and Noel have no choice to let their older brother go. After bidding Ragna farewell, Jin loses all memories of his brother. It is shown at the end of the game that he has been promoted to a higher rank, though according to developer interviews he can no longer fight due to his deal with Trinity having used up all of his energy.

Noel Vermillion
Voiced by (English): Cristina VeeVoiced by (Japanese): Kanako Kondō
 is the main heroine of the series, who was found as a young girl amidst the burning fields of Ikaruga where she was rescued, and then adopted by the noble Vermillion family. After her family was accused of treason, she enrolled in the Military Academy in an effort to save her family's name. It was because of her outstanding combat activity that she became a lieutenant of the NOL using the Nox Nyctores revolver , which apparently does not fire actual bullets but rather inflicts damage by creating distortions in dimensional space. At the start of the series, she was Jin's secretary. In truth, Noel suffers from amnesia, and is actually Mu-12, a Murakumo Unit created by Relius Clover, the predecessor of Nu-13 and the final boss in the console version of Continuum Shift. After being rescued by Ragna, Noel seeks out Rachel in Chrono Phantasma, who helps her learn to control her powers as Mu. In Central Fiction however, Noel separates from Mu to protect the gate to the Azure, and it is revealed that she is the Master Unit's link to the world, due to being based on the Origin itself. Once Noel merges with Mu once again, she is able to imprison Izanami within her soul with help from Ragna, recreating Saya, though she prefers to still use 'Noel' as her name, so as to prevent Izanami's mind from taking full control over her just recreated body. At the end of the final game, Noel is able to merge with "The Origin" within the Master Unit, having no choice but to allow Ragna to take the Unit outside of the world so that time will not loop nor will the world be destroyed any further, despite her and Jin's previous objections. At the end of the series, Noel, still keeping Izanami imprisoned within her soul, rebuilds Celica's church and presides as a nun there, along with Lambda, and is shown to be caring for a catatonic Nu-13. When offered a chance to rejoin the newly reformed NOL, she is unable to rejoin her friends due to having her hands full on her new current job. She does, however, offer to let her friends know the very instant Izanami (if possible) frees herself from Noel's soul to plague the Earth with eternal death once again. With her Drive, Chain Revolver, Noel does different attacks in an active stance.

Jonathan Oyama at VentureBeat gave Noel positive reception, where he described her as being "extremely effective as a fighter," and stated "Oddly enough, she's one of the few game characters who I can truly sympathize with. Just like Noel, I often have a tough time remembering my own past."

Rachel Alucard
Voiced by (English): Mela LeeVoiced by (Japanese): Kana Ueda
 is a vampire and the current head of the noble Alucard family. Despite her small appearance, she is a formidable opponent in battle, using her servants, Nago and Gii, as weapons, and her Drive, Silpheed, to control the wind. Rachel slipped out of her castle in search of fun because she hates to be bored, though in truth she is an 'Observer' tasked with watching over the actions of the main characters. Due to her hairstyle, several characters nickname her "Rabbit", a name that irritates her to no end, though Ragna seems to be the only one who can get away with calling her an idiot. Despite her status, however, she deeply loathes her vampiric impulses. She seems to be watching Ragna, as she is the one who accidentally turned him into a half-vampire by giving him her powers (this is also the reason behind his heterochromia and healing ability). Due to this, he is one of the only characters who is aware of her. Though Rachel often insults Ragna and treats him poorly, it is simply a ruse to hide the feelings she has developed for him. She also watches and toys with the other characters of the game as part of her amusement. At the end of Chrono Phantasma, she asks Tsubaki to kill her if she, Jin or Noel fails to kill Ragna. In Central Fiction it is shown that Rachel is losing her powers due to constant interference and she is shown to have reacted to Naoto due to his similarities to Ragna, making her lose her composure. In the ending, Rachel loses her memories of Ragna due to his sacrifice, but recalls having fond memories of someone whose name she does not know. It is implied that she will try to find Ragna once more, aided by White Justice, a Tsubaki from an alternate timeline.

Taokaka
Voiced by (English): Philece Sampler (BBCT - Alter Memory)
Voiced by (Japanese): Chiwa Saitō
, or Tao for short, is a catgirl who is a member of the Kaka tribe, wearing a large coat that obscures her true face, only exposing beady red eyes and a row of teeth (whether or not this is her true face is a mystery), paws for hands and feet, and a clearly visible tail. The rest of her body, from the chest to the ankles, is that of a human being, with tanned skin and large breasts. She wants to get back the sky above her village, which was sealed off by humans building cities above her village, was recently sent by the Elder to retrieve the bounty on Ragna's head, becoming a vigilante in the process. Despite this resolve, she is considerably food-obsessed and forgetful, often falling asleep on a whim, becoming hungry moments after a meal, or forgetting details moments after hearing them. She is good friends with Litchi, affectionately referring to her as "boobie lady". However, she does not seem to refer to anyone other than herself by name; she calls Ragna "good guy" (because he buys her food), Bang "scruffy man", Arakune "black squiggly", Noel "lacking lady", Hakumen "mask man", Nu "flappy-flap", and Jubei "cat person". She is unable to recognize that Ragna the "good-guy" and "Rawrgna" the criminal are the same person. It is revealed the Kaka tribe, which she hails from, is actually genetically-engineered from the genes of Jubei, one of the Six Heroes. With her Drive, Dancing Edge, Taokaka launches at her opponents in a torpedo-like fashion.

Iron Tager
Voiced by (English): Jamieson Price
Voiced by (Japanese): Kenji Nomura
Originally the leader of an Ikaruga unit,  suffered a mortal wound during the Ikaruga Civil War and was forced to withdraw. After his revival, he bears a similar resemblance to a demon, which resulted in him dubbed as the "Red Devil of Sector Seven". He was originally Bullet's captain before his near death at the hands of Azrael. In the end of Central Fiction, Tager and Bullet are now partners once again. Tager uses his Drive, Voltic Battler, to magnetize his opponents for a short period of time.

Litchi Faye-Ling
Voiced by (English): Lauren LandaVoiced by (Japanese): Chiaki Takahashi
 is a renowned doctor living in Orient Town, located in Kagutsuchi. She owns a clinic there and is helped by her assistant Linhua. She had worked with Tager and Kokonoe in Sector Seven until the incident where Lotte "Roy" Carmine, one of her colleagues whom she had feelings for, became Arakune. She defends the local townspeople from Arakune and seeks to restore him to his former self through any means necessary, even through death. She also seems to respect Bang Shishigami, even apologizing to him if she defeats him in a match, although she remains unaware of the true extent of his feelings for her. In Continuum Shift, Litchi is compelled to join the NOL by Hazama in order to obtain information that can help her save Arakune. By the end of Central Fiction Litchi is able to enter the Boundary, where she finds Roy alive and well, and that Arakune is simply a shade of himself used to anchor his existence until he had acclimated to the Boundary. Finding closure with Roy, Litchi returns to the real world and is given Roy's blessing to destroy Arakune. Bang, however, knocks her out to do the deed for her, so she would not have to kill even a shadow of the man she loved. Her Drive, Mantenbō (萬天棒 lit. Myriad Heavens Staff), enables her to control her bō staff of the same name while changing her moveset.

Litchi is described as "The hottest doctor in video games" in the list of the 50 hottest video game characters by Complex, where she ranked at 38th.

Arakune
Voiced by (English): Spike SpencerVoiced by (Japanese): Takashi Hikida
After an attempt to study the Boundary, he fell in and became what he is today, now housing innumerable insects with his now-blobby body and thriving on knowledge. His horrible condition has rendered him virtually insane and lacking any reliable memory, as well as distorting his speech to near incoherency (most of his dialogue consists of gibberish, insane laughter and tortured screaming). Throughout the series his sanity returns at times but is quick to disappear just as fast. Central Fiction later reveals that Roy was inside the Boundary the whole time and Arakune was just his vessel that allowed himself to exist within the Boundary. Due to acclimating to the Boundary, Roy no longer needs Arakune to anchor himself. Choosing to stay within the Boundary to study it, Roy gives Litchi his blessing to destroy Arakune after making peace with her. Although Bang carries out Roy’s last request for Litchi, so she will not suffer from killing even a mere shadow of a man she loved. With his Drive, Crimson, Arakune's special attacks fill his Curse Gauge.

Chris Hoadley of VentureBeat listed Arakune as "15 most significant new fighting game characters," where he commented that he "fits the genre's "freak" archetype with erratic movements and the ability to pester foes with insects after inflicting a curse," and credited him paving the way for similar characters in Marvel vs. Capcom 3 and Injustice: Gods Among Us.

Bang Shishigami
Voiced by (English): Tony Oliver (Calamity Trigger); Steve Kramer (Alter Memory)Voiced by (Japanese): Tsuyoshi Koyama
 is a ninja from Ikaruga village. He lost his home in the Ikaruga Civil War and his master Tenjō at the hands of Jin Kisaragi, and he and his followers began living in Kagutsuchi waiting for the right moment to strike back at Jin and the NOL. There, he declares himself a hero of love and justice, and dedicates himself to exterminating evil and overturning injustice wherever he goes. He is quite over-exuberant, prone to speeches and tangents as well as making dramatic entrances. He has a romantic fascination with Litchi, always willing to go charging in headlong if he sees someone making her upset. He is overzealous in every way, subtlety not usually at the forefront of his mind (this is only reinforced where his Astral Heat in Continuum Shift destroys almost all of his clothes), however his fiery spirit and will have earned him the respect of a few characters, most notably Hakumen. He also wants Ragna's bounty to rebuild the glory of Ikaruga. In Chrono Phantasma, it is revealed that Bang's giant nail is the Nox Nyctores, Phoenix: Rettenjō (鳳翼・烈天上 Hōyoku: Rettenjō), which greatly shocks him, and he decides to seek more answers about his weapon. Bang later learns that his weapon was in fact also a key to halt the flow of seithr across the world while also learning of Izanami's schemes. Donning a more serious attitude, Bang teams up with Ragna in order to help him save the world. In the end of Central Fiction, Bang leads a restoration of Ikaruga, under the order of his master's successor Homura. His Drive, Burning Heart, is a set of attacks that light up an icon in his Fu-Rin-Ka-Zan Gauge on hit.

Carl Clover
Voiced by (English): Michelle RuffVoiced by (Japanese): Miyuki Sawashiro
 is a young boy who, like Noel and Jin, was a student at the Military Academy, but dropped out without warning while Noel and Jin graduated. He is currently after Ragna's bounty and the Azure Grimoire, leading him to become a vigilante. He travels with a maid-like puppet called Nirvana, whom he believes to be his sister Ada. He is unwilling to see that she is, in fact, the Nox Nyctores , a causality weapon in the form of a marionette which amplifies its owner's desires to kill. After several people attempted to disassemble or remove Nirvana from him, Carl became extremely paranoid and possessive over her. He is the son of Relius, whom he hates and refuses to call his father. Despite this, over the course of the series Carl begins to slowly become more like Relius-a development many characters note. In the end of Central Fiction, Carl peeks into the boundary and is wounded in his right eye, blinding it but giving him an understanding of the nature of souls.  The finale of the series hints that Carl will walk down the same path as his father, donning an eyepatch with the same design as his father's signature mask. His Drive, Automaton, enables him to control Nirvana in battle.

Hakumen
Voiced by (English): David VincentVoiced by (Japanese): Tetsuya Kakihara
Leader of the Six Heroes,  is a mighty warrior wielding a long sword, the Nox Nyctores, . Though the armor acts as his body, Hakumen removes his mask at one point in the first game to reveal to an illusion of Ragna his face, though the player does not see it. Hakumen led mankind to defeat the Black Beast, and was said afterward to have been cast into a void between worlds known as the "Edge" after attempting to warn the people that they needed to "repent for their sins" lest the Black Beast return. The truth, however, is that Hakumen had Jubei seal him within the "Edge" alongside Yuuki Terumi to seal the latter away. After drifting in the "Edge" for hundreds of years, Kokonoe helped him return to the world, hoping to use him to defeat Terumi, but he set out to achieve his own agendas before being completely salvaged from the Edge. During his journey, he has also shown tremendous respect towards Bang and his unyielding spirit-something surprising given his normally strict disdain for others. Hakumen's true identity is Jin Kisaragi from an alternate time cycle, who fell into the Cauldron beneath Kagutsuchi trying to save Ragna from Nu-13. Transported to the distant past and wounded greatly, he was saved by Rachel and had his soul inserted into the Susano'o Unit, which Rachel came to possess after its original owner discarded it. In the finale of Central Fiction, after he prevents Nu from merging with Ragna, Hakumen is assaulted by Terumi, who destroys his soul to recover the Susano'o Unit as it was his true body. Despite this seemingly permanent death, at the end of the story Hakumen briefly reappears in some form to have one last talk with Trinity before fading away entirely. Though Hakumen is normally a cold, almost emotionless individual a hidden softer side is shown in his love for Tsubaki, who in his timeline died taking a fatal blow in his stead. His desire to save her stems from this, and he is one of her most stalwart allies throughout the story. He is also shown to deeply despise anybody who dares to hurt her, mainly Nu -No .13- as she was the one who caused Tsubaki a gruesome end in the previous timeline. His Drive is called Zanshin (斬神 lit. Slaying God), which projects a shield-like energy barrier that, when hit by an opponent's attack, will negate said attack and follow-up with an unblockable, invincible counter-attack.

Nu-13
Voiced by (English): Cristina VeeVoiced by (Japanese): Kanako Kondō
 is the main antagonist of Calamity Trigger, and a Murakumo Unit created by Relius Clover, who was forged in Kagutsuchi's Gates of Sheol. Her weapon is the Nox Nyctores, Lux Sanctus: Murakumo (神輝・ムラクモ  Shinki: Murakumo), a giant sword that breaks apart to become her armor and a set of floating swords. She was programmed, either by Relius or his partner, Hazama, to terminate anyone she deems as hostile subjects that come near the Gate. Despite normally acting as an emotionless girl who speaks in a mechanical fashion, Ragna's presence causes her to shift to the personality of a bubbly yet highly murderous girl who is in love with Ragna, showcasing traits typical of a yandere. Nu temporarily inhabits the body of a makeshift Murakumo unit named Lambda-11 during Continuum Shift, suffering amnesia and only remembering her love for Ragna. After she sacrifices herself to save Ragna from a fatal blow by Terumi, her soul leaves Lambda's body. After this, Hazama and Relius restore her in her original form and return her memories, reverting her back to her normal state while under their control. By Central Fiction, her more murderous and emotional personality becomes dominant though her sanity begins to dwindle along with it. At the end of the series, Nu suffers a fatal defeat at the hands of Ragna and Hakumen. She is shown alive in the ending but catatonic, being cared for by Noel and Lambda. Nu uses her Drive, Sword Summoner, to attack with sword-like projectiles at different angles.

Playable in BlazBlue: Continuum Shift

Tsubaki Yayoi
Voiced by (English): Julie Ann TaylorVoiced by (Japanese): Asami Imai
 is Jin's childhood friend/relative and Noel's former roommate from the Military Academy and a member of the NOL's 0 Division. She is described as a straight-A student, and has a rather no-nonsense personality. She is very serious and reserved, and is a member of the dignified Yayoi family, and possesses romantic feelings for Jin. In the true ending of Calamity Trigger, where she appears as a sub-character, she is assigned by Hazama to kill Noel and Jin, though this is just a false mission to further Hazama's objectives. In Continuum Shift, Tsubaki learns from Hazama that she was originally Jin's secretary in the previous timelines before Noel took her place in the current. This revelation, along with Hazama's goading, leads her to hate Noel due to the perception that she took everything from her, though Hazama intentionally did not tell her that she died in the previous timelines. In the end, Tsubaki was placed under the control of Izanami through the Mind Eater spell, turning her into a cold and emotionless enforcer of Izanami's will. However, in Chrono Phantasma, Tsubaki is freed thanks to the efforts of Jin, Noel, and Makoto and is able to unlock the true power of her weapon, Izayoi. In Central Fiction, Tsubaki learns from Jin that Ragna is his brother, and vows to help Jin out however she can. Though she disdains Ragna, she aids him as well for Jin's sake. Tsubaki also greatly admires Hakumen, though is unaware he is Jin until the end of the series, who in return is one of her most stalwart allies. In the end, once Izanami and Terumi's threats are over, Tsubaki and Makoto visit the church Noel has been residing, offering Noel a position in the newly reformed NOL alongside her and Makoto. Another Tsubaki from an alternate timeline appears in the end of the story, and though her appearance is obscured, the shape of her hair and possession of Hakumen's Okami implies she has inherited the Susano'o Unit and his duty as well. She teams up with Rachel to try and find Ragna, after he sacrificed himself to change the world into one of everlasting peace. This confirms in Alternative Dark War mobile spin-off that the particular Hakumen-look alike Tsubaki is from an alternate timeline and refer herself as White Justice. Tsubaki's weapon is the Sealed Weapon Izayoi (封印兵装・十六夜 Fūin Heisō – Izayoi), an Ars Armagus that enables her to control light, though it can potentially lead to blindness. Her Drive, Install, charges her Install Gauge.

Hazama
Voiced by (English): Erik Davies (Calamity Trigger); Doug Erholtz (Alter Memory onward)
Voiced by (Japanese): Yūichi Nakamura
, also known by his extend code name , a captain of the NOL's Intelligence Division and the main antagonist of Continuum Shift. He is an artificial human born from an Azure grimoire created by Relius to be a vessel for Terumi. Hazama fights with balisong knives and the Nox Nyctores, . His Drive, Ouroboros, enables him to summon chains that can be used to quickly move through the battlefield or attack his opponents. In Calamity Trigger, he appears to be supervising Noel's actions to keep her in line, but he has a sinister hidden agenda. Initially, it appears that Hazama has no will of his own and is simply a body and alias for Terumi, yet Chrono Phantasma reveals that the two share control of the body. Whenever Terumi is in control of Hazama's body, he discards the former's fedora hat and spikes up his hair, while gaining a manic look to his face. In Central Fiction, after separating from Terumi following a near-fatal clash with Platinum the Trinity, Hazama has decided to no longer be Terumi's vessel and wants to pursue his own desires to comprehend the emotions of others. Hazama goes through with this by inflicting as much pain, both physical and psychological, on others as he can, though Naoto and Ragna put a stop to his machinations. In the end, he and Relius jump into a Cauldron, with his fate unknown. His appearance in Bloodedge Experience hints that the cauldron deposited him in Naoto's timeline.

Chris Hoadley of VentureBeat listed Hazama as "15 most significant new fighting game characters," where he stated, "As a fighter, Hazama is a terror in close range with his knife slashes and Jayoku Houtenjin kick super, but in order to reach that point, he needs to use special chains to whip him around the screen," and credited him paving the way for similar characters in Marvel vs. Capcom 3.

Lambda-11
Voiced by (English): Cristina VeeVoiced by (Japanese): Kanako Kondō
 is an imitation Murakumo Unit created by Kokonoe by combining the body of the 11th experimental replica of Saya with the soul of Nu, which was recovered after falling into the Gates of Sheol during the conclusion of Calamity Trigger's Story Mode. Her Drive, Sword Summoner EX, is a copy of Nu's. Lambda's personality and self initially is deleted by Kokonoe to allow her to be a vessel for Nu. At the end of Continuum Shift, however, Nu sacrifices herself to protect Ragna from a fatal blow from Terumi, passing on her Idea Engine to him as she dies in his arms. Lambda's original self is resurrected in her own body once Izanami creates the Embryo, which she promptly enters in order to find Ragna. At the end of the series, Lambda is shown to have become a nun alongside Noel, and cares for a catatonic Nu. Lambda is in many ways a foil to Nu: she is calm, soft-spoken, and quiet, and while she loves Ragna like Nu does, she wishes to protect and aid him rather than murder him like Nu does. While Nu gradually becomes more aggressive and insane throughout the series, Lambda becomes more determined and stable, and in the end is shown to be able to live a normal life.

When being re-introduced in Chrono Phantasma Extend, Lambda became her own character to differentiate from Nu’s play style, although most of her moves remain the same as Nu’s.

Mu-12
Voiced by (English): Cristina VeeVoiced by (Japanese): Kanako Kondō
 is a Murakumo Unit created by Relius Clover, and Noel Vermillion's true form. She is the final boss of Continuum Shift. Her memories as Noel are sealed by Terumi after breaking her with intense psychological conditioning to hate the world, and she serves him for one purpose: to destroy the Sankishin Unit "Amaterasu" and erase the world from its existence. Due to this, she is called Kusanagi, the "Sword of the Godslayer" and the perfect form of a Murakumo Unit, and her hatred for the world has increased substantially, making her aggressive towards everything she fights. Like Nu, Mu wields the Nox Nyctores Lux Sanctus: Murakumo, though her version is different in color and appearance. Her Drive, Steins Gunner, projects a Stein to a targeted location. In the end of Continuum Shift, Ragna is able to undo Terumi's conditioning and restore Noel, who initially is afraid of her true self afterwards. However, in Chrono Phantasma, Noel acknowledges Mu as herself and is able to use her true abilities while retaining her personality. In Central Fiction Mu is separated from Noel after they learn the truth of the world in an effort to protect the gate to the Azure. This leaves Mu without a form and existing as only a soul, while an amnesiac Noel retains their body. Eventually, the two rejoin and are able to explain the truth of the world to Ragna and Jin, as well as the nature of Izanami. Noel is later able to assimilate Mu, and imprison Izanami, into her soul with Ragna's help and recreate Saya, though she still chooses to go by the name "Noel" to prevent Izanami's mind from controlling her. By the end of the series, Mu and Noel are one harmonious being again, with Izanami still imprisoned inside their shared soul, though for how long exactly is as of yet unknown.

Playable in Blazblue: Continuum Shift II

Makoto Nanaya
Voiced by (English): Cindy RobinsonVoiced by (Japanese): Tomomi Isomura
 is another classmate of Noel's and Jin's from the Military Academy, much like Tsubaki. She is a beastkin with squirrel-like features, and is considerably hyperactive with a short attention span though has surprisingly high intelligence. She is outgoing, adventurous, and has inhuman reflexes. She has a few complexes about her race but nonetheless proudly acknowledges who she is. She initially appears to be working under the NOL's Intelligence Division, but is actually an informant for Sector Seven. After officially defecting from the NOL, Makoto stays by Noel's side to help her throughout the story. At the end of the series, Makoto rejoins the newly reformed NOL with Tsubaki, and is last seen visiting Noel at her church. In battle, she fights using her specially-made cross tonfas, and her Drive, Impact, allows her to execute special attacks depending on the level of charge. Many characters in the story comment on Makoto having an unusually strong soul.

Platinum the Trinity
Voiced by (English): Laura Bailey (Continuum Shift II - Chrono Phantasma); Alexis Tipton (Alter Memory onward)
Voiced by (Japanese): Aoi Yūki
 is a young girl created by Trinity Glassfille, whose spirit inhabits her Nox Nyctores . While Trinity rarely possesses her and manifests herself for brief moments, Platinum has two co-existing personalities: a rude girl named  and a polite boy named  who both cherish Jubei. In Central Fiction, Trinity transferred herself into Jin's Yukianesa to help him stop the machinations of Izanami and Terumi. But this has causes Platinum to begin fading away as Luna and Sena are unable to maintain their existences within the Embryo on their own. But they are saved by Jin and Trinity, the former's power enabling Platinium to exist independently of Trinity. Following Terumi and Izanami's defeats, Trinity passing on, and Ragna's self-sacrifice, Luna and Sena are one harmonious being again, and are shown living peacefully with Litchi Faye-Ling in Kagutsuchi, working as nurses at her clinic. Platinum's Drive, Magical Symphony, equips her with a special item to use in battle.

Valkenhayn R. Hellsing
Voiced by (English): Doug StoneVoiced by (Japanese): Motomu Kiyokawa (BBCT - BBDW)
 is one of the Six Heroes and Rachel's elderly butler and trusted adviser who has served the Alucard family line for generations. He possesses a sharp wit and is concerned for Rachel's well-being. Valkenhayn seems to be worried about Rachel associating with things below her class (particularly Ragna, although others might apply), but he always acts in a sophisticated and gentlemanly manner. Before Ragna devices his final plan to save the world from looping itself in Central Fiction, Valkenhayn bids him farewell and good luck. At the end of the series, Valkenhayn is last seen pouring a tea while waiting for Rachel's return. Valkenhayn was once partnered with Relius Clover as an assassin in the past, and initially tried to kill Rachel's father before changing his ways and working under him. His Drive, Werewolf, enables him to transform into a wolf.

Playable in BlazBlue: Continuum Shift Extend

Relius Clover
Voiced by (English): Travis Willingham (CS - Alter Memory)Voiced by (Japanese): Junichi Suwabe

 is one of the three main antagonists of the series, alongside his partner, Yūki Terumi, and their mistress, Hades Izanami. Relius is Carl and Ada's father. He is a genius alchemist known as the Puppeteer, and revealed in Central Fiction to be formerly a wizard known as One of the Ten Sages, using both magic and science for his inventory. His inventions include the artificial human Hazama and his modifications to Saya's body, both of whom were used to host Terumi and Izanami respectively. He also created the Murakumo Units, which themselves consist of Nu-13, Lambda-11, and Mu-12, and the Nox Nyctores named Deus Machina: Nirvana, which he harvested his daughter's body to create. He completed the latter with help from Kokonoe of Sector Seven, only for his son Carl to steal it and use it against him. He summons Ignis into battle with his Drive, Detonator. Relius's main goal is to recreate the world to his desires, despising a world where the Master Unit controls everything. Though his plans are stopped in Chrono Phantasma and he becomes despondent for a time, Relius quickly recovers and decides to watch how the end of things will play out. He grooms Carl as his successor over the course of the series, and at the end of Central Fiction decides to leave the real world and enter the Boundary. His current fate is unknown.

Playable in BlazBlue: Chrono Phantasma

Amane Nishiki
Voiced by (Japanese): Akira Ishida
 is an effeminate young man clad in a kimono who's drawn to battle like it is a dance stage. He is armed with a seemingly living piece of cloth and his Drive, Spiral, involves transforming it into drills. It is hinted that he is immortal and seems to be acquainted with Rachel, who calls him "Uzume." In Central Fiction, he decides to directly intervene with the story to bring about a good ending, and directly aids the main protagonists. It is implied he is a deity like Susano'o, and he seems to be familiar with the Arbiter, Es. Despite his higher existence, not even Amane is able to retain his memories of Ragna at the end of the story-a fact he is aware of. Thus, he makes sure to give Ragna his respect before he disappears from the world.

Bullet
Voiced by (English): Erin FitzgeraldVoiced by (Japanese): Toa Yukinari
 is a mercenary who's been fighting and moving from battlefield to battlefield since a young age. She lost her entire squad during a mission for Sector Seven that she was left out of, and she seeks Kokonoe to find her answers as to why the tragedy happened. She later learns that Azrael fatally injured her captain, leading his transformation into a cyborg Iron Tager when he was rescued by Kokonoe. Though Tager does not have his memories of his time as a human, he and Bullet are nonetheless able to find a measure of closure for themselves, and Bullet is once again by his side at the end of Central Fiction. Her Drive, Lockon, allows her to rush towards her opponent to grab and throw them.

Azrael
Voiced by (English): D. C. DouglasVoiced by (Japanese): Hiroki Yasumoto
 is a fist-fighting soldier of Sector Seven whose strength seems unnaturally high. He enjoys violence and relishes the idea that he is fighting over life and death. Azrael's philosophy is to use only his own strength and nothing else, save for self-imposed limitations on his power. One of his victims was Bullet's captain, who becomes a cyborg known as Iron=Tager, leading Bullet to initially blame Sector Seven due to her squad working with them at the time. Though locked away by Sector Seven after the incident, the leaders of the organization later free him to work for them as a countermeasure against Kokonoe, who they believe is beginning to act against them. Azrael instead uses this as a chance to go on a warpath to engage in life-or-death fights once more. During a coliseum battle set up as a trap to lure him out by Kagura, he reveals to Bullet that he was the one who fatally injured her captain in the past before nearly killing her. Ragna later steps up to fight him, where Azrael attempts to goad him into using all of his Azure so he may fight Ragna at his most wild, uncontrolled state. Unimpressed that Ragna suppressed himself from being controlled by the Azure, he fights Kagura, who takes Ragna's place. Though Kagura is able to trap him in a dimensional prison, he breaks free in Central Fiction. Azrael decides to work with Izanami to fulfill his goal of finding a fight that would bring him to the brink of death. In the end, he is soon captured and frozen by both Kagura and Jin, and is then sealed away by Kokonoe make sure he never causes chaos again. His Drive, The Terror, allows him to find weak points on his opponents to exploit.

Izayoi
Voiced by (English): Julie Ann TaylorVoiced by (Japanese): Asami Imai
 is the form Tsubaki undertakes after gaining access to the true depths of the Izayoi's power as a prototype Murakumo Unit. Initially acting as the most extreme version of her mind-controlled self, she is returned to her true self by Noel, Jin, and Makoto. As a result, Tsubaki gains full access to this form at will. Her Drive is named Scarlet Justice, which increases the speed and power of all her special attacks while in Gain Art Mode. Izayoi was designed to kill Observers and other beings that normally cannot die, and as such possesses the "Immortal Breaker" ability that can do just that.

Kagura Mutsuki
Voiced by (English): Grant GeorgeVoiced by (Japanese): Keiji Fujiwara (BBCP - BBCF); Daisuke Namikawa (BBDW onward)
 Kagura is the representative Novus Orbis Librarium officer in the 5th Hierarchical City of Ibukido, and is known by the nickname "Black Knight". He is one of the disciples of Tenjo and plotting to overthrow the NOL to fulfill his master's wishes to have his master's son succeed as the true Imperator and reforming NOL. Kagura is also a member of the powerful Mutsuki family. Despite his position, Kagura is a laid-back individual who enjoys a wilder, flirtatious lifestyle. Despite this, he truly cares about the people of the world and is willing to do anything to create a better future for the NOL. Kagura works with Kokonoe and provides much aid for the main cast from Chrono Phantasma onward. His Drive, Black Gale, puts him into a stance where he can perform different moves.

Kokonoe
Voiced by (English): Julie Ann TaylorVoiced by (Japanese): Chie Matsūra
 is Tager's superior at Sector Seven, Roy (who became Arakune) and Litchi's former employer and Jubei and Nine's daughter. She is a half-beastkin, a child of two of the Six Heroes, though she shows unexplained disdain for this fact, supposedly "staying angry for weeks" when Jubei is mentioned. Kokonoe is a rather serious and cynical woman with no regard for emotions, and always strives for Tager to complete his missions without fail; however, she can on rare occasions be quite personable, mostly around her creations. She is displayed and perceived as cranky most of the time, though she harbors much sadness and rage beneath her usual facade. Her true mission is to kill Terumi whom she held a grudge against due to him supposedly killing her mother which somehow led her mother's downfall as well. Due to the fact that Terumi grows stronger the more one hates him, however, she has learned to temper her hatred enough that during one of her arcade scenarios, Terumi is utterly powerless against her. Kokonoe is a powerful magic user herself, but dislikes using it and prefers to use her inventions in combat. After assisting Ragna from Continuum Shift onward, she would later seal away Azrael thanks Jin and Kagura at the end of the series and still acts as Tager's superior, then now also Bullet's too after the mercenary was ready to learn the truth and reconcile with her cybernized captain. With her Drive, Graviton, Kokonoe uses a small machine that pulls her opponent towards it.

Yūki Terumi/Susanoo
Voiced by (English): Doug Erholtz (Terumi); Ray Chase (Susanoo)Voiced by (Japanese): Yūichi Nakamura (Terumi); Kenta Miyake (Susanoo)

 is the true, overarching main antagonist of the BlazBlue series, a member of the Six Heroes who worked alongside Hades Izanami and Relius Clover while causing many of the tragedies that occur throughout the series. He was originally the Sankishin  (or simply spelled as Susanoo), a brother deity to Amaterasu whom he served and grew to hate to the point of gaining his freedom by separating his soul from his body as it becomes the Susanoo Unit later used by Hakumen. Using host bodies like Kazuma Kval and later Hazama, becoming maniacal compared to his more calm original self, Terumi caused the creation of the Black Beast and the Azure Grimoire, betraying his fellow Heroes once the Black Beast was destroyed. He then oversaw the establishment of NOL and Sector Seven while kidnapping Saya to use as Izanami's host. While he uses Hazama's Nox Nyctores Geminus Anguium: Ouroboros and balisong knives, Terumi utilizes a more brutal and aggressive style. With his Drive, Force Eater, his attacks have heavy Heat Gauge gain, while the opponent gains none from being hit by (or blocking) them. As Susanoo his Drive is called Divine Warrior where he uses it to unlock more moves and has a more brutal fighting style but Susanoo's appearance in Cross Tag Battle no longer has the seals, and all of its exclusive seal moves are usable by default in the said crossover game. Susanoo's personality was calmer but more controlled rage fueled compared to his Terumi self.

After separating from Hazama in Chrono Phantasma, his former host nearly killed by Platinum, Terumi survived being destroyed by Hakumen by using self-observation as revealed in Central Fiction along with using the fear and hate of others to maintain himself temporary. With only a week left before he dissipates, unable to reclaim Hazama within the Embyro, Terumi raids the tomb of Clavis Alucard to acquire a relic known as Hihirokane that was meant to destroy him. Terumi bides his time until Noel absorbs and imprisons Izanami into her soul and becomes Saya again to force Hakumen's soul out of the Susanoo Unit and merge back into his body. Restored to his true self, Terumi absorbs Saya (Noel and Izanami together) to access the Azure as he attempts to wipe out all of existence. Ragna, Jin, and Trinity are able to stop him and tear him out of his body once more, with Ragna destroying Terumi for good once Trinity removes any chance of the villain maintaining his existence.

In an alternate continuity after Central Fiction, depicted in a crossover game BlazBlue: Cross Tag Battle however, Takamagahara system had been preserving the combat data of Susano'o before Terumi's death. When Hazama enters the Takamagahara system's white room, he inadvertently use the Keystone to create a new world by connecting BlazBlue multiverses and other unseen completely different universes. As a result of his presence inside the white room, Takamagahara scans the remains of Terumi within Hazama's body, creating an incomplete clone of Susano'o. Despite its incomplete state, the Susano'o clone is as dangerous as the original and will still endanger the multiverse. As the time of multiverse's destruction is nearing fast, Hazama and the system to host a stamp collecting contest to find worthy contestants who can defeat the clone. Eventually, Naoto Kurogane and Ragna defeated the clone, yet the sentient Keystone system is still recovering from a result of holding off the clone from breaking free when "she" entrusted Hazama a role on hosting the contest, leaving otherworldly contestant to join a tag team battle royale until "her" full recovery.

Playable in BlazBlue: Chrono Phantasma Extend

Celica A. Mercury
Voiced by (English): Carrie SavageVoiced by (Japanese): Iori Nomizu
 is Nine's younger sister, and Kokonoe's aunt. She is a powerful magic healer whose true power is the control over the flow of life, though she cannot heal seithr poisoning. During the Phase Shift novels, Celica briefly traveled with the hero Bloodedge during the Dark War, whilst trying to find information about her father, Shūichirō Ayatsuki. After the Dark War, she watched over the Black Beast's remains and built a church, waiting for a chance to reunite with Bloodedge. She was also the caretaker of Ragna, Jin, and Saya, and was killed by Yūki Terumi's attack on the church in 2192. Despite this, in Chrono Phantasma, Kokonoe makes a copy of Celica's soul, using a time when Celica temporarily entered the Boundary and placing it in a cloned body, reincarnating her in the modern time as a time-displaced being called a 'Chronophantasma.' However, this Celica has a short lifespan as she was created for the sole purpose of activating 'Kushinada's Lynchpin,' A weapon capable of disrupting the flow of seithr, before her status as a Chronophantasma makes her fade away. Due to another method being found, Celica is able to remain in the present for longer than expected. Shortly after sending the heroes after Izanami during their final attempt to stop her, Celica finally fades out of existence with a tearful goodbye to Ragna and Noel. Its purpose is to protect Celica and amplify her powers. Celica's Drive, Minerva, enables her to control Minerva in battle.

Playable in BlazBlue: Central Fiction

Hibiki Kohaku
Voiced by (Japanese): Mitsuhiro Ichiki
 is an assassin from the Kohaku clan and an assistant to Kagura, providing support and back-up for him from a nearby distance. As Kagura's servant and assistant, he is loyal to a fault and would do whatever he is commanded. Despite this, he has a sharp tongue and often criticizes Kagura's actions often (such as excessive drinking or his behavior towards women), though Hibiki admits that he truly admires Kagura. He is described as "a pretty boy with a poison tongue". His arcade scenario in Central Fiction shows the possibility that Hibiki may in truth wish to assassinate Kagura and his own emotions with him, turning him into the perfect killing. Ultimately, however, this scenario never comes to pass, and Hibiki remains loyal to Kagura to the end. Hibiki's Drive, Double Chase, allows him to make a duplicate of himself.

Naoto Kurogane
Voiced by (English): Billy Kametz (Cross Tag Battle 1.5 - 2.0)
Voiced by (Japanese): Nobunaga Shimazaki
, born  is the main protagonist of the novel series, Bloodedge Experience. He is from an alternate timeline than the main games and is gifted with the Hunter's Eye, which allows him to see the 'life-force' value of others. Much like Ragna, he becomes a servant to a vampire named Raquel Alucard, who seems to be the Rachel Alucard of his world. His life-force value hovered around 9,810 until he became Raquel's servant. In Central Fiction, Naoto is searching for Raquel, who mysteriously disappeared, and made his way into the main timeline. As revealed by Relius, Naoto did at one point exist in the main timeline, but has been long dead after Clavis Alucard killed him. When he talks to Raquel through Rachel, he is tasked by his mistress to save the world he is currently in, as their world is connected and is in danger of disappearing due to the problems in the main timeline. His sister, Saya Terumi, is hinted to be the basis for the 5th Prime Field Device, potentially making him the uncle of Ragna, Jin and Noel/Saya. After helping Ragna calm down at a point in the story where he almost lost himself to rage, Naoto's purpose in the main timeline is fulfilled and he is sent to his own timeline, where he reunites with Raquel. With his Drive, Bloodedge, Naoto creates iron objects from blood. His brown eyes turn red and his brown hair turns white through heavy usage, making him heavily resemble Ragna.

Nine the Phantom
Voiced by (English): Amanda C. Miller
Voiced by (Japanese): Ayumi Fujimura (CP - Cross Tag Battle 1.0); Rie Tanaka (Cross Tag Battle 2.0 onwards)
, more commonly known by the alias , is a witch and one of the Six Heroes. She passed down her knowledge of magic to mankind during the Dark War. During the Dark War, she journeyed alongside Bloodedge and later created the Nox Nyctores in order to help humans fight against the Black Beast. After the war, she married Jubei and started a family with him, giving birth to Kokonoe. Unfortunately, she discovered what Terumi's future plans were, for which he supposedly killed her. In truth, Nine survived and fell into the Boundary, where she learned the truth of the world. Enraged at being subject to the whims of the Origin within the Amaterasu Unit, Nine began to plot the destruction of the Amaterasu Unit and the recreation of the world with an artificial 'god' in Amaterasu's place, where the world would not loop due to the desires of any one being. To this end, she allows Izanami to manipulate her, disguising herself as the enigmatic . In Central Fiction, Nine returns as a shadow of her true self, filled with unquenchable rage and sorrow who cares only for Celica, and enact her plans. Though she desires to kill Ragna as she blames him for the world's state due to the Master Unit reversing time to try and save him, she is later defeated by him after an intense fight. After recognizing Ragna's potential to change the way of the world, Nine makes peace with her husband and daughter and buys the protagonists time to figure out a way to stop Izanami by freezing time around her temporarily, before fading away. Nine does not possess a drive, which makes her exceedingly strong, and instead relies on her mastery of magic in combat. In-game, this manifests as a trait called The Abyss Diver, which activates a spell stored in her Active Slot.

Hades Izanami
Voiced by (Japanese): Yukana
 is one of the main antagonists of the BlazBlue series, and one of the masterminds behind all the misdeeds throughout the series. She is the main antagonist of Chrono Phantasma and the majority of Central Fiction. Using Saya as her vessel, Izanami plots to bring permanent death to the entire world, killing off all life forever and leaving an empty, silent world. She first appears at the end of Continuum Shift as the NOL Imperator, before later giving up the position willingly as she no longer requires it for her plans. She is the drive of the Master Unit Amaterasu, and is its power of 'destruction.' This makes her the embodiment of death in the real world, meaning she cannot truly be killed. By the time of Central Fiction her host body is beginning to fail and deteriorate. Relius reveals that not many bodies would be able to host her without immediately decaying or falling apart, and that it truly speaks to Saya's power that it could hold Izanami as long as it did. Initially cold, unfeeling, and emotionless, her time using Saya as a vessel causes her to develop a sense of self and personality. After speaking with Relius on the nature of her existence, she decides that because she revels in the death and despair she causes that her desire to cause the death of the world is not due to being Amaterasu's drive but because of her own desires. Though she comes dangerously close to achieving her objective of the death of all life, Ragna is able to help Noel recreate Saya by imprisoning Izanami into her soul, where she remains to this day by the end of the series. Notably, this is the only time in the series where Izanami truly feels fear, as her imprisonment within Noel's soul results in the destruction of her 'self' afterwards – the only way her body can truly die, though her mind still lingers within Noel's mind. It is currently unknown when and how exactly Izanami will (if ever) free herself from Noel's soul. With her Drive, Sharin <Exodus Arc>, Izanami activates her weapon, allowing her to shoot Magatama projectiles, but removing her ability to block.

Es
Voiced by (Japanese): Mayuka Nomura
 is the primary heroine of XBlaze series. She makes her first playable appearance in BlazBlue: Central Fiction, introduced in the console version as DLC. Es's Drive, Crests Arts, turns the trail of her sword attacks into a trail of damage dealing Crests. She is the gate keeper of the Azure, and her duty sees her memories repressed and her returned to the emotionless state she first appeared in within her own series. Despite this, her memories will occasionally resurface, and she retains her deep love of pudding. She goes by the name , disguising herself as a high school student within XBlaze universe. Es is implied to have a history with Amane given their interactions. She is later revealed to be a false gatekeeper designed to draw attention away from Ragna, the true gatekeeper. After the end of the story, Es remains guarding the gate to the Azure though she later disappears. There are some hints that the Es seen guarding the gate in BlazBlue may simply be a recreation of the real Es, but nothing is outright stated.

Mai Natsume
Voiced by (Japanese): Saori Hayami
 is the protagonist of the Heart manga series duology (Remix Heart and Variable Heart), two side-stories in Chrono Phantasma Extend, and introduced as a playable character in the console version of Central Fiction. She is described as being cheerful and forward-looking, sincerely sympathetic towards others and valuing her friends above all else. Mai was a classmate and friend of Noel Vermillion, Tsubaki Yayoi and Makoto Nanaya, as well as the roommate of Kajun Faycott, during their time at the Military Academy. After leaving the academy, Mai worked for Sector Seven alongside Kajun under Kokonoe. Though she had been missing to her friends for many years, Mai reappears in Central Fiction alongside Kajun to assist her friends in the final battle. At the end of the series, Mai and Kajun help Platinum acclimate to a normal life in Kagutsuchi. Initially unsure about his new gender and wishing to find a way to return to his original sex, Mai begins to come to view herself as female and eventually accepts who she really is inside. She obtained a spear during Variable Heart called  which she has used ever since. It is a Legacy Weapon replica that is as powerful as a Nox Nyctores. Her Drive has the same name as her spear and enables her to throw Outseal at her opponent, which she can change the direction of mid-flight and home into enemies if it initially misses.

Jubei
Voiced by (English): Kirk Thornton
Voiced by (Japanese): Masaki Terasoma
As revealed in Phase 0, he was originally named Mitsuyoshi, and did not take up the name Jubei until after the Dark War. He is a beast-man and is the father of Kokonoe. It is also revealed Taokaka and her clan were genetically engineered from his DNA. Jubei's weapon is the Nox Nyctores, which is a pair of kodachi blades that can cut "what cannot normally be cut."

Playable in BlazBlue Alternative: Dark War

Rei
The player protagonist who works for Mitsurugi Agency. Players can change the character’s gender and name.

Ciel Sulfur
Voiced by: Rina Honnizumi
 mysterious agent of Mitsurugi Agency.

The character also appears as a bonus chibi avatar in Season 2 updates of BlazBlue: Cross Tag Battle.

White Justice
Voiced by: Asami Imai
, much like how Hakumen being an alternate future Jin Kisaragi from a destroyed Calamity Trigger timeline, is an alternate Tsubaki Yayoi who dons a sister counterpart to Susano’o unit, the White Justice unit. The character briefly debuted in the ending of BlazBlue: Central Fiction storyline.

Non-playable characters

Ada Clover
Voiced by (Japanese): Chiaki Takahashi

 is Carl's older sister, and frequently doted on him when she was still human. Due to her affection, Carl idolized her, and frequently spoke highly of her to his friends at school (much to their amusement). One day, for reasons unknown, she agreed to become the subject of one of her father's experiments, but according to the story, there was a possibility Ada was forced.

Amateratsu
The Amateratsu Unit also known as the Master Unit is one of the three Sankishin units and the sister unit to Tsukuyomi and Susanoo. Amateratsu is a giant Satellite machine that is the most powerful of the original units due to warping reality. It was discovered by Humanity and was give the Izanagi systerm and the Izanami. It was wield by the Origin the first prime field device.

Black Beast
The  is the legendary beast that threatened to cause much calamity before the series' start. It was confronted by the Six Heroes and sealed away. In actuality, it is a combination of Ragna and Nu-13 fusing together inside of the Cauldron (i.e. Ragna is its body, and Nu was its heart). Ragna can transform into the Black Beast on their own in the bad endings, and Arakune is in the process of becoming one in Central Fiction. It was revealed that during the Prime Field War, humanity created the first Black Beast to kill all the Prime Field Devices out of fear that they would become a danger to humanity. Humanity created the Takamagahara System to manipulate time so that they would be able to use the Amaterasu Unit to recreate the world after the inevitable destruction of it from the conflict of the Black Beast and the Prime Field Devices. However, the Prime Field Device that had first succeeded in contacting Amaterasu utilized it before they could, recreating the world and becoming the 'god' of it. A different Black Beast is mentioned in XBlaze and is implied to be the Yamata-No-Orochi of Japanese legend.

Bloodedge
Voiced by (English): Patrick Seitz
Voiced by (Japanese): Tomokazu Sugita
 was an ordinary man who single-handedly halted the Black Beast for an entire year during the Dark War and gave the Six Heroes the time to teach humanity magic to fight back. His sword and jacket are now in Ragna's possession following his death, though it is revealed that Bloodedge is actually Ragna from the original future of Calamity Trigger timeline where Noel Vermillion did not exist during Chrono Phantasma. Bloodedge and Hakumen (the latter being formerly Jin Kisaragi) were the only survivors of the timeline they originated from. Due to Bloodedge’s heroic sacrifice against Black Beast, this leaves Hakumen as the sole survivor of original Calamity Trigger timeline to be living in the current timeline.

Claire Vermillion
 is Noel's foster mother. Claire was unable to conceive naturally, and as such the noble Vermillion family were without an heir until her husband Edgar adopted the Murakumo unit Mu-12 out of pity. Claire is mostly kind and caring towards Noel, but is also not afraid to discipline.

Clavis Alucard
Voiced by (Japanese): Tamio Ōki (CP); Akio Ōtsuka (2024-onward)
 was the previous head of the Alucard family, said to have lived for over a millennium. He watched over the human race and helped prevent the Black Beast from destroying them, as well as sealing Yūki Terumi inside the Boundary before the Six Heroes were formed. Rachel Alucard is his daughter, and Valkenhayn R. Hellsing served as his butler before (and after) working with the Six Heroes. Though deceased by the time of the games, he appears during Ragna's trip to the Dark Wars in Chrono Phantasma. Central Fiction reveals the connection with Naoto Kurogane’s fates, whereas he killed Naoto in the main timeline, while in Bloodedge Experience not only he spare Naoto’s life, also have a daughter named Raquel instead of Rachel.

Edgar Vermillion
 is Noel's foster father and head of the once-noble Vermillion family. Following the Ikaruga Civil War, he, out of pity, adopted the Murakumo unit Mu-12 as his daughter Noel. Shortly thereafter, the Vermillion family lost their nobility after Edgar harshly criticized the NOL's ruthless actions. The NOL then charged both he and his wife Claire with treason and threatened to banish the household from the Control Organization, forcing the Vermillions to go into hiding. Like Claire, he too cares deeply for Noel's well-being.

Homura Amanohokosaka
Voiced by (Japanese): Inori Minase
Homura is the son of the former NOL Imperator Tenjō Amanohokosaka. Following the abandonment of the post by Izanami, he assumes his rightful role as Imperator. In the Japanese games, Homura's gender is never specified.

Ignis Clover
 is Relius Clover's wife, and Ada and Carl's mother. Like her daughter, she was transformed by her husband into the battle doll named . She does the bidding of Relius Clover, engaging in combat on his command. She is one of Relius' Detonators whose powers can rival those of the Nox Nyctores.

Ikaruga Ninjas
Ikaruga Ninjas are Bang Shishigami's familiars and remnants of the proud ninjas of Ikaruga. They are often seen by Bang's side as his loyal followers after they all moved to Ronin-Gai after the Ikaruga Civil War.

Totokaka
Totokaka is a wise and old member of the Kaka Clan who seemingly supervises the entire clan. She is quite intelligent, unlike most other members of the clan, and she speaks very articulately, lacking the feline verbal tic common among most Kaka Clan members.

Kajun Faycott
Voiced by (Japanese): Saki Fujita
 is one of the main characters of the manga BlazBlue: Remix Heart and BlazBlue: Variable Heart. She is introduced as Mai Natsume's eccentric roommate at the Military Academy. However, in reality she was an undercover agent from Sector Seven sent by Kokonoe to obtain the Burning Red Grimoire.

In BlazBlue: Cross Tag Battle, Kajun is one of the main lobby characters who greet the player and act as the guide for the initial portion of the game.

Kazuma Kuvaru
 is the protagonist of the novel BlazBlue: Phase Shift 1, but turned into one of the main antagonists within the current Phase Shift series. Suffering from amnesia and hallucinations, Kazuma is unable to remember anything seven years prior to the start of Phase Shift 1. He disliked physical activities, and preferred to stay in-door reading. With Relius Clover (his tutor at the time), he apparently traveled the world, then studied at the Magic Guild. Apparently, due to being quiet and disliking the outdoors, some people become uneasy around him. He was actually an artificial body for Yuki Terumi in which he succeeds in merging with him and was lost in the Boundary with his successor Hazama taking his place. Despite perishing, his legacy lives on in the form Terumi takes as a ghost, or rather particularly Hazama.

Linhua
Voiced by (Japanese): Yukiko Kato
 is a young girl who works as Litchi's assistant in her clinic in Orient Town. Linhua admittedly looks up to Litchi, and even looks out for her well being, to the point where she even fights against Tager in the story to protect her, punching his giant, metal hide until her fists began to bleed.

Lord Tenjō Amanohokosaka
 was Bang Shishigami's former sensei and leader of Ikaruga before she was slain by Jin Kisaragi during the Ikaruga Civil War. This caused Bang to seek revenge on him. In one of Bang's endings in Story Mode, Valkenhayn R. Hellsing mentions that Lord Tenjō's son, Homurs might still be alive, which then confirmed in Chrono Phantasma, where Homura is under Kagura’s protection. Bang heads to Ikaruga in his canon ending to find the answers he seeks.

Nago and Gii
Voiced by (English): Cindy Robinson (Gii)
Voiced by (Japanese): Masaru Suzuki (Nago); Sena Tsubaki (Gii; Calamity Trigger ~ Continuum Shift); Saeko Zogo (Gii; Chrono Phantasma ~ onward); Kazue Fujita (Gii; Drama CD)
Rachel's servants who are her weapons in battle.  is Rachel's black transmogrifying cat that speaks and acts just as snobbishly as her. He is often seen in umbrella form but he could also morph into and be used as either a Lobelia (bat lance) cannon or a comfy chair.  is Rachel's stout red bat familiar. He is often burdened by Rachel's orders during teatime, or her fits wherein she has the penchant of either using him as a footrest or pinching his cheek. Due to his chubbiness, he is either mistaken for a flying pig or have at least been threatened to be eaten twice in the Story Mode.

Raquel Alucard
Voiced by (English): Mela Lee
Voiced by (Japanese): Kana Ueda
 is one of the main characters in Bloodedge Experience light-novel. Her life-force value hovers around 80,000,000. She is the one who revived Naoto through turning him into a dhampir like Rachel did on Ragna, giving him the power of the Azure and the Drive, Bloodedge, in which regenerated his old right arm and manifested a weapon from his blood.

In Central Fiction, the reality where she and Naoto come from is destroyed, but since Raquel is connected to the Boundary, she managed to send Naoto to another world, which is the starting point of their world’s possibility. Raquel warned Naoto that he should not touch the fragment of the Blue, and she briefly possessed her counterpart, Rachel to explain to Naoto what happened to him, asking him to save their world. After Ragna recreated his world at cost of ceasing his own existence, Raquel was seen near Naoto, but it is unknown whether they were in their own restored reality, or in the prime universe.

Saya
Voiced by (Japanese): Kanako Kondō (as Izanami in Continuum Shift); Yukana (Continuum Shift Extend ~ onward [As Izanami])
 is the younger sister to both Jin and Ragna. She was born with a frail body, which led to Ragna caring for her. This caused her brother Jin to grow jealous of her for having more quality time with Ragna than him, and he began to bully her to get Ragna back into his life. Jin's jealousy grew so much that he eventually attempted to kill her with the Nox Nyctores, Yukianesa, immediately after she gave it to him as a gift to stop his bullying. However, it is hinted that, in Central Fiction, Jin's attempt to kill her was instead brought on by insanity induced by Yukianesa, and that Saya giving it to him was part of his delusions. She was kidnapped by Yūki Terumi shortly after and was given to Relius Clover to be used as a "vessel" for Hades Izanami. In Central Fiction, it is revealed that Saya's body was heavily modified by Relius to better suit Izanami, though it is falling apart by that point in time. Izanami references Saya's feelings throughout the series, mainly to taunt Ragna. Once Noel assimilates and imprisons Izanami into her soul, the two merge and bring Saya back with both Noel and Izanami's memories. It is due to the fact that Izanami is now trapped inside of her, that Saya chooses to still use the name 'Noel', so as to not let Izanami take full control of her just reunified body. After assimilating the Origin as well at the end of the series, Saya loses all of her memories as Izanami due to Ragna's self-sacrificial actions, and therefore goes by just 'Noel'. She and Lambda-11 now work as nuns at the church she grew up in, as they care for a catatonic Nu-13. It is as of now unknown whether or not Saya is aware of Izanami still imprisoned within her soul, or if she knows, if possible, when or how she will free herself from Saya's will and control.

Shūichirō Ayatsuki
 was a scientist, alive before the Dark War. He is the father of Nine and Celica, and later the father-in-law of Jubei and the grandfather of Kokonoe. Shūichirō Ayatsuki was a scientist working with Relius Clover and to some extent Yuki Terumi, referred as the man with green hair and a snake-like smile, before the emergence of the Black Beast; he died shortly after its creation.

Takamagahara
Voiced by (English): Geoffrey Chalmers, Bryce Papenbrook, and Wendee Lee
Voiced by (Japanese): Unknown

The  are three entities named TA, TB, and TC. The Takamagahara is the "supreme program" created by mankind, and its goal is to destroy the Master Unit, Amaterasu, so that it can control the flow of space and time and give existence a cold, mechanical sense of order. It is also the one responsible for the time loops in Calamity Trigger every time their plans fail. At the end of Continuum Shift, Terumi is able to trick Takamagahara with the help of the Izayoi to blind them, using Ragna defeating Mu as a distraction, and upload a virus created by Phantom to infect them, so that Izanami can take over its powers and use them for her own plots.

The Origin
Voiced by: Yukana
The Origin is the first Prime Field Device and the one who discovered the Master Unit: Amaterasu. She started to develop a will and as such was sealed away by humanity in the Boundary. After the Prime Field Wars destroyed the world, the Origin recreated the world using the Master Unit and became its 'god' in the process. She is often referred to synonymously with the name Amaterasu, though she is not the deity that gives its namesake to the Unit. Despite this, the Origin does not wish for this and wants to be freed of her duty, and has come to see Ragna as her 'hero' that would save her. Every time Ragna dies or the world reaches a point where Ragna could not reach her, the Origin would reset it until Ragna found a greater path. It is due to this that the Origin has earned the ire of many other characters, notably Terumi and Izanami, whose war against each other for conquest of the world is always interrupted by the Origin's many time resets. Eventually, Noel reveals herself as the Origin's 'true' hero, as the two women are actually two quarters of Saya's soul. Noel, who has already merged with Saya's other two quarters, Mu-12 and Izanami, proves this by merging with the Origin, freeing her from her position in the 'Master Unit' and repairing Saya under Noel's control. Despite this, afterwards Ragna speaks to another being inside the Master Unit that shows the traits of both Saya and Naoto's sister, Saya Terumi. It is unknown if this is a piece of the Origin left in the unit, Amaterasu herself, or another entity entirely.

Tomonori
 is Jubei's younger brother, Konoe's brother-in-law, and Kokonoe's uncle. He appears briefly in BlazBlue: Phase Shift 1, attempting to stop Yūki Terumi from merging with Kazuma, but he is unsuccessful and was killed.

Torakaka
Voiced by (Japanese): Kaori Yagi
 is a warrior of the Kaka clan. She is Taokaka's mentor, former village guardian, and is very knowledgeable about the current situation, as she is able to (seemingly) recognize Litchi being seduced by the Azure Grimoire in an injured Ragna's possession and stop her from acting on the impulse. Contrary to how Torakaka looks, she speaks quite dignified and sparingly uses the feline verbal tic Taokaka has. Tager also comments on how much more clever she is than the rest of the Kaka clan.

Trinity Glassfille
Voiced by (English): Laura Bailey (BBCS - BBCP); Alexis Tipton (Alter Memory onward)
Voiced by (Japanese): Aoi Yūki
 is a member of the Six Heroes who made a name for herself as the  during the Dark War before sealing her soul in her Nox Nyctores, Arma Reboare: Muchōrin which is currently used by her creation and host body Platinum the Trinity. She studied at the Magic Guild alongside Celica and Nine. Due to a comment dropped by Hazama, she was implied to be indirectly responsible for allowing him to kill Nine, due to him tricking her into releasing Nine's "Ruby: Mind Eater" spell from him which allowed him to kill both Trinity and Nine, as explained in one of the Phase Shift novels. In Central Fiction, Trinity separated from Luna and Sena and transferred herself into Yukianesa to aid Jin, later enabling the two kids to coexist in their shared vessel harmoniously and independently of her as she passes on to the afterlife.

Tsukuyomi
The Tsukuyomi Unit is a giant shield wield by Rachel Alucard and one of the three Sankishin units brother of Amateratsu and Susanoo. It is by far the most mysterious among its siblings.

XBlaze characters

Toya Kagari
Voiced by: Yukitoshi Kikuchi
Toya Kagari is the main protagonist of XBlaze and uses the powers of the titular artifact, which is similar to that of Ragna's.

Hinata Himezuru
Voiced by: Rei Mochizuki
Hinata is the adopted younger sister of Yuki. She is the titular Code Embryo.

Kuon Glamred Stroheim
Voiced by: Yui Kondō
Kuon is a major character in XBlaze and is the user of the Legacy Weapon: Sealed Spear Izayoi.

Mei Amanohokosaka
Voiced by: Inori Minase
Mei is a descendant of the priestess of the Azure and the ancestor to Tenjo and Homura from BlazBlue.

Akira Kamewari
Voiced by: Yoshimasa Hosoya
Akira is Toya's best friend and carries a willpower similar to the power of order.

Marcelyn F. Mercury
Voiced by: Chie Matsura
Marcelyn F. Mercury is one of the Ten Saints under Zwei and also known as Ringo Akagi.
She also is implied to be Nine's ancestor.

Yuki Himezuru
Voiced by: Tomomi Isomura
Yuki Himezuru is the adoptive older sister to Hinata and the daughter of one of the victims of Ripper.

Elise von Klagen
Voiced by: Nozomi Yamamoto
Elise is a messenger of the Magic Guild and a partner to Kuon.

Kazuto Kotetsu
Voiced by: Akira Kanazawa
Also known as Avenge he had been hunting down the serial killer Ripper and is implied to be a scientist.

Soichiro Unomaru
Voiced by: Takahiro Sakurai
Soichrio Unomaru is one of the antagonists of XBlaze and one of the creators of the T-system. He was killed by Sechs. He also shows some similarities with Terumi/Hazama and was also called a snake.

Ryoko Kagari
Ryoko is a minor character in XBlaze and is the mother of Toya Kagari.

Ripper/Freaks
Voiced by: Kenichi Suzumura
Ripper is a serial killer with similar abilities of a Kaka though he does have a similar appearance of Hazama. He was killed by Avenge, the man hunting him down throughout the game. He returns in Lost Memories as Freaks the main villain.

Es-N
A group of artificial humans created by Sochiro to capture Toya. While most of them died, at least one survived and lives with Mei. Their appearance is similar to Nu 13.

Acht
Voiced by: Seiko Yoshida
A woman who was a member of the Ten Saints in XBlaze and uses ice powers. She died by turning into seithr.

Drei
Voiced by: Kentaro Tone
Drei was a member of the Ten Saints under the number three and was killed at the end.

Sechs
Voiced by: Hiroyuki Kinoshita
Sechs under the title Six of the Ten Saints is the main antagonist of Code Embyro and the half-brother of Kuon. He is also similar to Ragna, like Toya, but whereas Toya resembles Ragna in personality, Sechs resembles him in appearance. He is killed by Toya at the end of the game.

See also
For crossover playable characters in BlazBlue: Cross Tag Battle:
List of Persona 3 characters
List of Persona 4 characters
List of RWBY characters
Akatsuki Blitzkampf#Characters
Arcana Heart#Characters
Under Night In-Birth#Characters
Senran Kagura#Characters

References

Fighting game characters
Lists of video game characters